Alla Gopala Krishna Gokhale is an Indian cardiac surgeon at Apollo Hospitals.

Life
He is known for being the first to perform a successful human-to-human heart transplant and first successful lung transplant in the state of Andhra Pradesh, India. He was honored by the Government of India with the Padma Sri award in 2016.

References

External links
Dr. Gokhale CT Associates - official website o

1959 births
Living people
Indian cardiac surgeons
Recipients of the Padma Shri in medicine
20th-century Indian medical doctors
Scientists from Vijayawada
Medical doctors from Andhra Pradesh
20th-century surgeons